The Canadian Immigrant Investor Program was an initiative of the federal government of Canada created in 1986 to promote the immigration of business people and their families, enabling qualified investors to obtain permanent resident status in Canada. Under the program, successful applicants and their families received permanent and unconditional Canadian residential visas and were then eligible to obtain Canadian citizenship. With the passing of Economic Action Plan 2014 Act (Bill C-31) on June 19, 2014, the program was terminated and undecided applications were cancelled.

Overview 
The Canadian Immigrant Investor Program was one of the most popular immigration investor programs (IIP) in the world, but its requirements were not changed since its inception and it had become one of the least expensive ones. As of June 26, 2010, the qualification requirements were doubled and the program was briefly suspended while the new changes came into effect. The new updated program was reopened on December 1, 2010.

At the time of termination, qualified investors needed to have at least two years of business management experience; have a minimum net worth of CAD$1,600,000 (legally obtained); alone or with their accompanying spouse, make an investment of CAD$800,000; and meet certain health and security requirements. The closest alternative to the Canadian Immigrant Investor Program would now be immigrating through the Owner-Operator Labour Market Impact Assessment (LMIA) pathway, which is a 2 staged process.

References

External links
 https://www.exeo.ca/blog/invest/canada-immigrant-investor-program-what-happened

Immigration to Canada
Residency
Government programs
Foreign direct investment